First United Methodist Church is a historic church at 322 Lamar Street in Paris, Texas.

It was built in 1922 and added to the National Register in 1983.

See also

National Register of Historic Places listings in Lamar County, Texas

References

United Methodist churches in Texas
Churches on the National Register of Historic Places in Texas
Churches completed in 1922
20th-century Methodist church buildings in the United States
Churches in Lamar County, Texas
Paris, Texas
National Register of Historic Places in Lamar County, Texas